Anurogryllus, commonly known as short-tailed crickets, is a genus of crickets in the tribe Gryllini; species are recorded from the Americas. The common and scientific names derive from the vestigial, poorly developed ovipositors of females.

Species
The Orthoptera Species File database lists the following species:
Anurogryllus abortivus (Saussure, 1874)
Anurogryllus amolgos Otte & Perez-Gelabert, 2009
Anurogryllus annae Otte & Perez-Gelabert, 2009
Anurogryllus antillarum (Saussure, 1874)
Anurogryllus arboreus Walker, 1973
Anurogryllus beebei Otte & Perez-Gelabert, 2009
Anurogryllus brevicaudatus Saussure, 1877
Anurogryllus celerinictus Walker, 1973
Anurogryllus cubensis (Rehn, 1937)
Anurogryllus ecphylos Otte, 2006
Anurogryllus ellops Otte & Perez-Gelabert, 2009
Anurogryllus forcipatus (Saussure, 1897)
Anurogryllus fulvaster (Chopard, 1956)
Anurogryllus fuscus Caudell, 1913
Anurogryllus gnomus Otte & Perez-Gelabert, 2009
Anurogryllus hierroi Otte & Perez-Gelabert, 2009
Anurogryllus matheticos Otte, 2006
Anurogryllus muticus (De Geer, 1773)
Anurogryllus nerthus Otte & Perez-Gelabert, 2009
Anurogryllus nigua Otte & Perez-Gelabert, 2009
Anurogryllus nyctinomos Otte & Perez-Gelabert, 2009
Anurogryllus toledopizai (de Mello, 1988)
Anurogryllus toltecus (Saussure, 1874)
Anurogryllus typhlos Otte & Peck, 1998
Anurogryllus vanescens Otte & Perez-Gelabert, 2009
Anurogryllus vibrans Otte & Perez-Gelabert, 2009

References

Gryllinae
Orthoptera genera
Taxa named by Henri Louis Frédéric de Saussure